Maurice Béné (24 August 1884, in Sèvres – 19 December 1960) was a French politician. He represented the Radical Party in the Constituent Assembly elected in 1946 and in the National Assembly from 1946 to 1958.

References

1884 births
1960 deaths
People from Sèvres
Politicians from Île-de-France
Radical Party (France) politicians
Members of the Constituent Assembly of France (1946)
Deputies of the 1st National Assembly of the French Fourth Republic
Deputies of the 2nd National Assembly of the French Fourth Republic
Deputies of the 3rd National Assembly of the French Fourth Republic